Kayla Moleschi (born October 25, 1990) is a Canadian rugby union player. She won a gold medal at the 2015 Pan American Games as a member of the Canadian women's rugby sevens team. She is known as a core contributor with an explosive step.

Career
In 2016, Moleschi was named to Canada's first ever women's rugby sevens Olympic team and also named Rugby Canada 2016 Women's Sevens Player.

In June 2021, Moleschi was named to Canada's 2020 Summer Olympics team.

References

External links
 

1990 births
Living people
Canadian female rugby union players
Rugby sevens players at the 2015 Pan American Games
Rugby sevens players at the 2019 Pan American Games
Pan American Games gold medalists for Canada
Rugby sevens players at the 2016 Summer Olympics
Olympic rugby sevens players of Canada
Canada international rugby sevens players
Female rugby sevens players
Olympic bronze medalists for Canada
Olympic medalists in rugby sevens
Medalists at the 2016 Summer Olympics
Pan American Games medalists in rugby sevens
Medalists at the 2015 Pan American Games
Medalists at the 2019 Pan American Games
Rugby sevens players at the 2020 Summer Olympics
Canada international women's rugby sevens players